The Patriarchal Stavropegic Monastery of St John the Baptist is a monastic community for both men and women, directly under the Ecumenical Patriarchate. It is located in Tolleshunt Knights, near Maldon, Essex, in England, and is the oldest Orthodox religious community in the UK.

The religious community was founded in 1958 by St Sophrony of Essex, under the jurisdiction of Metropolitan Anthony, Metropolitan of Sourozh and ruling Russian bishop in England, with six monastics from a number of nations; soon after, in 1965, the monastery moved under the direct jurisdiction of the Ecumenical Patriarchate.

The community is distinctive in that it is a double monastery, consisting of both women and men living the monastic tradition of a Christ-centred prayer life. Currently, there are just under 40 monastics in the community, the majority of whom are nuns, with a smaller number of monks.

After the death of St. Sophrony in 1993 the Archimandrite was Father Kyrillos. Since his retirement in 2019 the Archimandrite has been Father Peter (born 1977).

Daily life 
When founding the monastery, St Sophrony wanted to be sure that his community would not just have outward conformity, but have its focus on inner asceticism. The typikon of the monastery, consisting of repetition of the Jesus Prayer for approximately four hours per day and Divine Liturgy three or four times per week, found inspiration in Elder Sophrony's experience in the Athonite desert, and precedent in Athonite skete practise, St Nicodemus and St Paisius Velichkovsky.

Also, another distinctive part of this monastery is that it is a double monastery. That is, the community has both monks and nuns in separate residential quarters. This is rare, but is not unheard of, in Orthodox monasticism.

History 
The Patriarchal Stavropegic Monastery of St John the Baptist had its beginnings largely in the person of St Sophrony of Essex. After his departure from Mount Athos, where he had been a disciple of Saint Silouan the Athonite, and his subsequent move to Paris, he was to live in a Russian old-people's home, assisting the priest there. Soon, two men would seek out St Sophrony, desiring the monastic life. They were allowed to live at the old-people's home, using the repetition of the Jesus Prayer in lieu of liturgical books and eating the food that the old-age inhabitants did not eat. There were also a few nuns living at the home at this time.

By 1958, St Sophrony had six people living around him, seeking the monastic life. Realising that such a situation could not continue, he went to Tolleshunt Knights, near Maldon, Essex, England, to inspect a property; in early 1959, the new Community of St John the Baptist was formed at the same property, under Metropolitan Anthony's omophorion. The monastery, from its beginnings, had both monks and nuns, due to Elder Sophrony being unable to oversee two separate communities.

The Monastery of St John the Baptist moved under the omophorion of the Ecumenical Patriarchate in 1965, becoming patriarchal; later, the monastery would also be titled Stavropegic.

Death of St Sophrony 
The monastery had been informed that the only way that it could bury people on its property was to build an underground crypt, which it proceeded to build, and to which St Sophrony said that he would not repose until the crypt was ready. Then, having been told of the expected completion date of 12 July 1993, Elder Sophrony stated that he "would be ready". On 11 July, St Sophrony died; and his funeral and burial were held three days later, attended by monastics from around the world. Mother Elizabeth, the eldest nun, died soon after on 24 July, according to Elder Sophrony's words that he would die first, and she would die soon after.

Cycle of services 
Saturday: 7:00 am - Hours and Divine Liturgy
5:00-9:00 pm - Vigil

Sunday: 7:00 am - Hours and Divine Liturgy and a second Divine Liturgy at 10:15 am

3:00 pm - Vespers and Paraklesis, followed by talks in Greek and English

Daily: 6.00-8:00 am (except when the Divine Liturgy is served) and 5:30-7:30 pm - Repetition of the Jesus Prayer

Tuesday and Thursday: 7:00 am - Hours and Divine Liturgy

Feastdays: Vigil on the preceding evening; Hours and Divine Liturgy in the morning

Publishing 
One of the motivating factors behind St Sophrony's move to France was the publishing of St Silouan's books. When St Sophrony moved to England, the monastery became the publisher of these works. In 1973, a more complete translation of the life of St Silouan, titled Monk of Mt Athos, was published; followed in 1975 by Wisdom of Mt Athos, a collation of the writings of St Silouan. After this, St Sophrony began to publish books of his own, beginning with His Life is Mine in 1977 and then We Shall See Him As He Is in 1985. In 1987, the Holy Synod of the Ecumenical Patriarchate glorified St Silouan the Athonite, and in 2019 St Sophrony of Essex himself.

Books published by the monastery 
 Monk of Mt Athos, by Archimandrite Sophrony (Sakharov), 1973
 Wisdom of Mt Athos, by Archimandrite Sophrony (Sakharov), 1975
 His Life is Mine, by Archimandrite Sophrony (Sakharov), 1977
 We Shall See Him As He Is, by Archimandrite Sophrony (Sakharov), 1985
 On Prayer, by Archimandrite Sophrony (Sakharov), 1996
 Christ Our Way and Our Life, by Archimandrite Zacharias, 2001
 The Hidden Man of the Heart, by Archimandrite Zacharias, 2007
 Conversations with Children: Communicating our Faith, by Sister Magdalen, 2001

Notable inhabitants 

 St Sophrony of Essex, the first abbot, 1959-1993
 Archimandrite Kyrillos, second abbot, 1993-2019
 Archimandrite Peter, third abbot, 2020–present. Author of Theology as a Spiritual State: in the Life and Teaching of Saint Sophrony the Athonite.
 Archimandrite Zacharias, author of Christ Our Way and Our Life, Monasticism, the All-embracing Gift of the Holy Spirit and more.
 Sister Magdalen, noted speaker, author of Reflections on Children in the Church Today and Conversations with Children: Communicating our Faith.
 Sister Gabriela, iconographer and mosaic artist, author of Seeking Perfection in the World of Art.

See also 
 Fahr Convent

References

Citations

Sources 

 I Love Therefore I Am, by Hmk Nicholas V Sakharov.

External links 
 Website of the Archdiocese of Thyateira & Great Britain
 A Taste of Monastic Life, report by Dwynwen East on a pilgrimage held on 17–20 September 2003.
 CD recording of the Service of St Silouan the Athonite, chanted in Greek by Simonopetra Monastery, Mt Athos; copyrighted by St John the Baptist Monastery, Essex.

Eastern Orthodox monasteries in the United Kingdom
Monasteries in Essex
20th-century Christian monasteries
Patriarchal Stavropegic Monastery of St. John the Baptist